Yamaguchi Station is the name of multiple train stations in Japan.

 Yamaguchi Station (Aichi) in Aichi Prefecture
 Yamaguchi Station (Yamaguchi) in Yamaguchi Prefecture

See also
 Kōhoku Station (Saga), formerly called Yamaguchi Station (until 1913) or Hizen-Yamaguchi Station (until 2022)